John Thomas Lenahan (November 15, 1852 – April 28, 1920) was a Democratic member of the U.S. House of Representatives from Pennsylvania.

Biography
John T. Lenahan was born in Jenkins Township, Pennsylvania.  He graduated from Villanova College in 1870.  He studied law at the University of Pennsylvania in Philadelphia, Pennsylvania.  He was admitted to the bar in 1873 and commenced practice in Wilkes-Barre, Pennsylvania.  He was a delegate to the Democratic National Conventions in 1892 and 1896.

Lenahan was elected as a Democrat to the Sixtieth Congress.  He was not a candidate for renomination in 1908.  He resumed the practice of law, and died in Wilkes-Barre.  Interment in St. Mary's Cemetery.

Sources

The Political Graveyard

1852 births
1920 deaths
Pennsylvania lawyers
University of Pennsylvania Law School alumni
People from Luzerne County, Pennsylvania
Democratic Party members of the United States House of Representatives from Pennsylvania
19th-century American lawyers